The men's decathlon at the 2012 European Athletics Championships was held at the Helsinki Olympic Stadium on 27 and 28 June.

Medalists

Records

Schedule

Results

100 metres
Wind: Heat 1: +0.8 m/s, Heat 2: +0.7 m/s, Heat 3: +0.8 m/s, Heat 4: -0.3 m/s

Long jump

Shot put

High jump

400 metres

110 metres hurdles
Wind:Heat 1: -0.5 m/s, Heat 2: -0.5 m/s, Heat 3: +0.2 m/s

Discus throw

Pole vault

Javelin throw

1500 metres

Final standings

References

100 m Results
Long jump Results
Shot put Results
High jump Results
400 m Results
110 m H Results
Discus Results
Pole Vault Results
Javelin Results
1500 Results
Final Results

Decathlon
Combined events at the European Athletics Championships